Nanchez is a commune in the Jura department of eastern France. The municipality was established on 1 January 2016 by the merger of the former communes of Chaux-des-Prés and Prénovel. On 1 January 2019, the former communes Les Piards and Villard-sur-Bienne were merged into Nanchez.

See also 
Communes of the Jura department

References 

Communes of Jura (department)